M. quinquemaculata may refer to:

Manduca quinquemaculata, the five-spotted hawkmoth, or its larval form the tomato hornworm
Mordellistena quinquemaculata, a beetle species of the family Mordellidae